Renouf is a family name of Norman origin. The name derives from the Norse settlement of Normandy, from the Old Norse words 'ragn' (council, advisor) and 'ulf' (wolf).

People with this name include:
Alan Renouf (1919–2008), former senior Australian Government official
Brent Renouf (born 1988), Australian rules footballer
Émile Renouf (1845–1894), French painter and draughtsman
Frank Renouf (1918–1998), New Zealand tycoon and husband successively of Susan and Michèle Renouf
George Renouf (1878–1961), Canadian politician
Michèle Renouf (born 1946), former Australian-born advertising actress, third wife of Frank Renouf, and defender of Holocaust deniers' legal rights
Peter le Page Renouf (1822–1897), British Egyptologist
Steve Renouf (born 1970), Australian rugby league footballer
Susan Renouf (born 1940), Australian socialite and second wife of Frank Renouf
 Prof. L. P. W. Renouf (1887–1968), Irish biologist

Notes

Surnames of Norman origin